Frits Hoogerheide (27 March 1944 – 3 November 2014) was a Dutch racing cyclist. He finished in last place in the 1970 Tour de France. He also rode in the 1970 Vuelta a España, and finished 2nd on two stages.

Major results
1968
 2nd Ronde van Midden-Nederland
 3rd Overall Olympia's Tour
1969
 1st Stage 7 Olympia's Tour

References

External links
 

1944 births
2014 deaths
Dutch male cyclists
People from Woensdrecht
Cyclists from North Brabant